Max van Schaik (born 28 June 1991) is a Dutch basketball player. Van Schaik is 2.07 m (6 ft 9 in) tall and usually plays as power forward.

Early career
Van Schaik played for the youth department of Joventut Badalona in the 2008–09 season.

Professional career
Van Schaik started his career in Spain in the LEB Plata, playing two seasons for respectively CB Prat and CB Guadalajara. In 2011, Van Schaik signed with GasTerra Flames of the Dutch Basketball League (DBL). After one season for the Flames, he left for Den Helder Kings. In 2014, Van Schaik transferred to Apollo Amsterdam where he went on to become one of the team's most important players. In the 2015–16 season, he made his first DBL All-Star Game appearance.

On October 19, 2018, Van Schaik signed a one-month contract with New Heroes Den Bosch. He played three games with New Heroes.

On January 19, 2019, it was announced Van Schaik returned to Apollo Amsterdam.

International career
Van Schaik played for the U18 and U20 Netherlands national team.

References

1991 births
Living people
Apollo Amsterdam players
CB Prat players
Heroes Den Bosch players
Den Helder Kings players
Donar (basketball club) players
Dutch Basketball League players
Dutch expatriate basketball people in Spain
Dutch men's basketball players
Power forwards (basketball)
Basketball players from Amsterdam